"The Light" is a song by American heavy metal band Disturbed, from their sixth album Immortalized. It was released as a single on 5 October 2015. Upon its release, the song was noted by many critics for its uplifting lyrics, unusual within the band's discography.

Track listing

Music video
Directors Culley Bunker and Craig Bernard were tapped to direct the video, which features the band performing in front of a burning building, intercut with a sort of a mini-movie about a firefighter who is disfigured in a fire, but then manages to find love with his rehabilitation nurse. The video was published to YouTube on November 20, 2015 and has over 80.5 million views as of early October 2020.

Personnel
 David Draiman – lead vocals, backing vocals
 Dan Donegan – guitars, bass, keyboards, backing vocals
 Mike Wengren – drums, percussion, backing vocals

Charts

Weekly charts

Year-end charts

References

2015 songs
Song recordings produced by Kevin Churko
Disturbed (band) songs
Reprise Records singles
Songs written by Dan Donegan
Songs written by David Draiman
Songs written by Mike Wengren
Songs written by Kevin Churko